Albacon is the Albany science fiction convention, held each year in the Albany, New York area, also called the Capital District.

Albacon is the largest "Con" in upstate New York, United States.  It is hosted by LASTSFA, or Latham-Albany-Schenectady-Troy Science Fiction Association, a local science fiction fandom group.  The Albacon website lists itself as:

Past Albacons
The con has hosted many special guests.  In 2006, the Guest of Honor (GoH) was Peter David, a novelist most famous for his short stories, television shows and The Incredible Hulk comic book; the Artist Guest of Honor was Omar Rayyan.  Additional guests in 2006 included online cartoonist Jeph Jacques, Nick Sagan (son of Carl Sagan and a science fiction writer in his own right), and Klingon linguist and psychologist Lawrence M. Schoen.

Other guests at recent Albacons have included filker Erwin S. Strauss (Filthy Pierre), humorist-novelist Esther Friesner, Shannara creator Terry Brooks, Lois McMaster Bujold, novelist Don Sakers, and science fiction researcher and fan Jan Howard Finder ("The Wombat").

Albacon was not held in 2007, because LASTSFA co-hosted the World Fantasy Convention in Saratoga Springs, New York, with Guests of Honor Carol Emshwiller, Kim Newman, Lisa Tuttle and artist Jean Giraud (Moebius).

Guests of Honor & Special Guests

Future Albacons
The next Albacon will be Albacon 2022 to be held September 16-19 2022.  See website for location and programming.

Scottish Albacons
The Albacon name was also used by a series of science fiction conventions held in Glasgow, Scotland from 1980 to 1998. The name was created from both Alba, the Scottish Gaelic name for Scotland, and because the first convention in 1980 was held in the then-named Albany Hotel in Glasgow.

References

External sources

 Albacon
 LASTSFA
 Fancyclopedia entry

Science fiction conventions in the United States
Capital District (New York)
Conventions in New York (state)
1996 establishments in New York (state)